Siboganemertidae is a family of worms belonging to the order Polystilifera.

Genera:
 Sagaminemertes Friedrich, 1968
 Siboganemertes Stiasny-Wijnhoff, 1923

References

Polystilifera
Nemertea families